Heather Dubrow (born January 5, 1969) is an American actress and television personality. She portrayed Lydia DeLucca in the television series That's Life in 2000 and starred in the reality television series The Real Housewives of Orange County from 2012 to 2016, rejoining the show in 2021. She married in 1999; she was known by her full birth name, Heather Paige Kent, from 2001 to 2012.

Career
Dubrow was born in the Bronx and grew up in Chappaqua, New York. She is a fifth-generation American of Jewish ancestry (from Germany, Hungary, and Poland). In 1990 she graduated from Syracuse University with a Bachelor of Fine Arts Degree. 

Heather joined The Real Housewives of Orange County in Season 7 and left the series after Season 11.  Dubrow rejoined the cast in 2021 for its 16th season, and is returning for the show’s upcoming 17th season. In June 2020, it was announced Dubrow alongside her husband Terry, would host and executive produce The Seven Year Stitch for E!.

Personal life
Heather Dubrow is a member of Sigma Delta Tau Omega Syracuse University chapter.

In 1999, Dubrow married plastic surgeon Terry Dubrow. They live in Orange County, California and have four children.

Publications

Dr. and Mrs. Guinea Pig Present The Only Guide You'll Ever Need to the Best Anti-Aging Treatments. Ghost Mountain Books. ISBN 1939457556 (2016)

The Dubrow Diet: Interval Eating to Lose Weight and Feel Ageless. Ghost Mountain Books. ISBN 978-1939457714 (2018)

The Dubrow Keto Fusion Diet: The Ultimate Plan for Interval Eating and Sustainable Fat Burning. William Morrow Books. ISBN 0062984322 (2020)

Filmography

References

External links

20th-century American actresses
21st-century American actresses
American film actresses
American television actresses
American people of Polish-Jewish descent
Jewish American actresses
Living people
Actresses from New York City
People from the Bronx
The Real Housewives cast members
Syracuse University alumni
People from Chappaqua, New York
1969 births
21st-century American Jews